Jean Welz (1908–1975) was a South African artist.

Biography 
Johann Max Friedrich Welz was born in Salzburg, Austria, in 1900, into a family in the picture-framing and gilding trade. Called Hans in his youth, he studied art and architecture, and in 1925 traveled to Paris, and worked with prominent modern architects producing a handful of villas of his own until 1937. It was during this period that he adopted the name Jean.

In 1937 Welz emigrated to South Africa with his wife the Danish journalist, Inger Christensen, and their young son, and began work as an architect at the University of the Witwatersrand, where he designed the entrance foyer of the Great Hall and the Institute for Geophysical Research. In 1939 he became ill with tuberculosis and moved with his family to Barrydale in the Little Karoo, where he and his family operated a tea-room.

In 1941 Welz became principal of the Hugo Naudé Art Centre in Worcester, Western Cape, remaining in Worcester for 28 years. He held his first exhibitions in Stellenbosch and Cape Town in 1942, and the same year became a member of the New Group of South African artists, a loose association of mostly younger artists.

Welz was a successful and influential artist until he again became ill in 1968. His health deteriorated and he died in 1975. One of his sons, Martin Welz, is a well-known South African investigative journalist. Another, Stephan Welz, was an art dealer.

Career 
Welz came to Paris without any official licensing but found work with architects Robert Mallet-Stevens and Adolf Loos. Welz was heavily involved in Loos' Tzara House (1926) and Loos introduced him to Robert Fisher as a talented designer. Although Fisher was a fan of Loos' modern approach, he relied on Welz to put the theories into practice and gave him free rein of Maison Dubin (1928). Fisher, unlike many architects depending on a junior, allowed Welz to take much of the credit and the building was right next door to Le Corbusier's Villa Cook (1926).

Welz exhibited widely from 1942 until his last major exhibition in 1970. In 1947 he was awarded the Silver Medal of the South African Academy for Arts and Science for his picture Earthenware and cupboard door. In 1969 the South African Academy for Arts and Science awarded him the Medal of Honour for painting.

Architecture 
 1928  Maison Dubin, with Raymond Fisher, Boulogne-Billancourt, France
 1930  Laura Marx(Karl's daughter) gravestone, Paris, France - destroyed by Nazi's 1940
 1931  Villa Landau, Epinay-sur-Seine. France - now functions as the Maison de Justice et du Droit
 1932  Villa Darmstadter, Vaucresson, France
 1933  Maison Zilveli, Paris, France - currently under extensive restoration, may not be saved.
 1937  Austrian Pavilion Proposal, Paris, France (project)

Exhibitions 
 1942  First one-man show, Cape Town.
 1942  South African Academy New Group Art Exhibitions.
 1948  Overseas exhibition of South African Art, Tate Gallery
 1952  Van Riebeeck Tercentenary Exhibition, Venice Biennale.
 1953  Rhodes Centenary Exhibition.
 1957  São Paulo Biennale.
 1966  Republic Fest Exhibition, Pretoria.
 1970  Prestige Retrospective Exhibition, South African National Art Gallery and Johannesburg Art Gallery.

References 
  

 
 

1908 births
1975 deaths
20th-century South African architects
20th-century South African painters
20th-century male artists
South African male painters